Elk Grove High School is a public four-year high school located in Elk Grove, California, in the United States. It is part of the Elk Grove Unified School District and serves the southeast end of Elk Grove that is to the right of California State Route 99 and below Sheldon Road.

History

Elk Grove Union High School was the first union high school in the state of California. Sixteen elementary districts voted to tax themselves for a high school, and they all remained as separate districts until the entire K-12 district unified in 1959. The high school opened its doors in 1893 at its first site on Main Street (now Derr Street and Elk Grove Boulevard in Old Town). In 1922, a new brick building was constructed on the corner of Elk Grove Boulevard and Elk Grove Florin, where the Joseph Kerr Middle School campus is today. In 1964 a new campus was built closer to Elk Grove Park to move overcrowded high schoolers from the small campus. When the school was moved to its present location it was as a three-year senior high school with grades 7-9 at the junior high. Elk Grove is the second oldest high school in Sacramento County. Until 1977, Elk Grove High was the only comprehensive high school in the district.  According to Newsweek Magazine's Elk Grove High School has ranked in the top 5% of the nations high schools from 2006–present. In April 2009, Elk Grove High School was awarded the California Distinguished School award.

Athletics

Elk Grove High school is home of the Thundering Herd. The Thundering Herd football program has won 15 conference championships and five Division 1 championships. Lance Briggs, a linebacker for the Chicago Bears, is an alumnus. In 1997 the Herd's baseball team was ranked #9 in the nation by Baseball America. To date Elk Grove has had sixteen alumni make it to the major leagues.

Notable alumni

Jonathan Angel - actor
Scott Boras - sports agent
Lance Briggs - former linebacker for Chicago Bears
Matt Kopa - former offensive tackle for New England Patriots
Dylan Carlson - first round 2016 MLB Draft pick by the St. Louis Cardinals
David Freitas - baseball player
Spencer Levin - PGA golf professional
Bill Cartwright - former center for Chicago Bulls
Ryan Dinwiddie - CFL quarterback for Winnipeg Blue Bombers
Mike Fischlin - former MLB shortstop, Houston Astros, Cleveland Indians, New York Yankees, Atlanta Braves
Marcus Riley - linebacker for St. Louis Rams, Chicago Bears
Stephanie Cox - Olympic gold medalist, USA Women's Soccer Team; coach
Adrian Ross - former NFL player, Cincinnati Bengals
Jason McDonald - former MLB outfielder, Oakland A's
John "Buck" Martinez – former MLB catcher for Kansas City Royals (1969–77), Milwaukee Brewers (1977–80) and Toronto Blue Jays (1980–86), manager of Blue Jays (2000–02), manager of Team USA (2006), TV commentator
J. D. Davis - MLB player for San Francisco Giants
Chris Robyn - drummer for band Far
Shaun Lopez - lead guitarist for band Far, founding member of band The Revolution Smile, co-founder of band Crosses
Jeff Jaworski - founding member of punk band Red Tape, lead singer for Will Haven from 2007–09
Anthony 'Pag' Paganelli - guitarist for Will Haven, lead singer and guitarist for band Horseback; guitarist for bands Tenfold and Shortie
Jason Jiménez - former Major League pitcher for Tampa Bay Rays and Detroit Tigers
Scott Smith - professional mixed martial artist, former WEC Light Heavyweight Champion
Willy Tate - former tight end for the Tampa Bay Buccaneers, Kansas City Chiefs
David Hernandez - pitcher for Arizona Diamondbacks
Rowdy Tellez  - baseball player for the Milwaukee Brewers
Tyler, The Creator - recording artist
Kenny Wiggins - former offensive tackle for San Diego Chargers, current Detroit Lion 
Nick Madrigal - second baseman for the Chicago Cubs
Ken Hottman - Baseball Player
Derek Hill - Center Fielder for the Detroit Tigers

Principals
 Eugene Christmas 2018-2022
 Karl Urban(Interim Principal) 2018-2018
 Cathy Guy 2004–2018
 Frank Lucia 1997-2004
 LuAnn Boone 1996-1997
 Paula Duncan 1989-1996
 Will Sawyer 1978-1982?
 Richard D Sovde 1969-1975 
 Donald R. Morrison 1962-1968 
 Ken McDonald stayed for 2 years 
 Glen Beeman for many years prior to district unification

References

External links
 Official website

Educational institutions established in 1893
High schools in Sacramento County, California
Public high schools in California
Elk Grove, California
1893 establishments in California